San Diego County, officially the County of San Diego, is a county in the southwestern corner of the U.S. state of California. As of the 2020 census, the population was 3,298,634, making it California's second-most populous county and the fifth-most populous in the United States. Its county seat is San Diego, the second-most populous city in California and the eighth-most populous city in the United States. It is the southwesternmost county in the 48 contiguous United States, and is a border county. It is also home to 18 Native American tribal reservations, the most of any county in the United States.

San Diego County comprises the San Diego-Chula Vista-Carlsbad, CA Metropolitan Statistical Area, which is the 17th most populous metropolitan statistical area and the 18th most populous primary statistical area of the United States as of July 1, 2012. San Diego County is also part of the San Diego–Tijuana transborder metropolitan area, the largest metropolitan area shared between the United States and Mexico.

This forms the most densely populated region of the county, which has a mild Mediterranean to semiarid climate and extensive chaparral vegetation, similar to the rest of the western portion of Southern California. Precipitation and temperature extremes increase to the east, with mountains that receive frost and snow in the winter. These lushly forested mountains receive more rainfall than the average in Southern California, while the desert region of the county lies in a rain shadow to the east, which extends into the Desert Southwest region of North America.

There are 16 military installations, of the U.S. Navy, U.S. Marine Corps, and the U.S. Coast Guard in San Diego County. These include Naval Base San Diego, Marine Corps Base Camp Pendleton, Marine Corps Air Station Miramar, Naval Air Station North Island, and Coast Guard Air Station San Diego.

From north to south, San Diego County extends from the southern borders of Orange and Riverside Counties to the Mexico-U.S. border and the Baja California municipalities of Tijuana and Tecate. From west to east, San Diego County stretches from the Pacific Ocean to its boundary with Imperial County, which separated from it in 1907. Since 2010, statewide droughts in California have further strained San Diego County's water security.

History

The area which is now San Diego County has been inhabited for more than 12,000 years by Kumeyaay (also called Diegueno and Ipai/Tipai), Payómkawichum (Luiseño), Kuupangaxwichem (Cupeño), ʔívil̃uqaletem (Cahuilla), and the Acjachemen (Juaneño) Indians and their local predecessors.

In 1542, the explorer Juan Rodríguez Cabrillo, who may have been born in Portugal but sailed under the flag of Castile, claimed San Diego Bay for the Spanish Empire, and he named the site San Miguel. In November 1602, Sebastián Vizcaíno surveyed the harbor and what are now Mission Bay and Point Loma and named the area for Saint Didacus, a Spaniard more commonly known as San Diego. European settlement in what is now San Diego County began with the founding of the San Diego Presidio and Mission San Diego de Alcalá by Spanish soldiers and clerics in 1769. This county was part of Alta California under the Viceroyalty of New Spain until the Mexican declaration of independence. From 1821 through 1848 this area was part of Mexico.

San Diego County became part of the United States as a result of the Treaty of Guadalupe Hidalgo in 1848, ending the Mexican–American War. This treaty designated the new border as terminating at a point on the Pacific Ocean coast which would result in the border passing one Spanish league south of the southernmost portion of San Diego Bay, thus ensuring that the United States received all of this natural harbor.

San Diego County was one of the original counties of California, created at the time of California statehood in 1850.

At the time of its establishment in 1850, San Diego County was relatively large, and included all of southernmost California south and east of Los Angeles County. It included areas of what are now Inyo and San Bernardino Counties, as well as all of what are now Riverside and Imperial Counties.

During the later part of the 19th century, there were numerous changes in the boundaries of San Diego County, when various areas were separated to make up the counties mentioned above. The most recent changes were the establishments of Riverside County in 1893 and Imperial County in 1907. Imperial County was also the last county to be established in California, and after this division, San Diego no longer extended from the Pacific Ocean to the Colorado River, and it no longer covered the entire border between California and Mexico.

Geography

The county is larger in area than the combined states of Rhode Island and Delaware.

San Diego County has a varied topography. Most of San Diego between the coast and the Laguna Mountains consists of hills, mesas, and small canyons. Snow-capped (in winter) mountains rise to the east, with the Sonoran Desert farther to the east. Cleveland National Forest is spread across the central portion of the county, while the Anza-Borrego Desert State Park occupies most of the northeast.

Although the county's western third is primarily urban, the mountains and deserts in the eastern two-thirds are primarily undeveloped backcountry. Most of these backcountry areas are home to a native plant community known as chaparral.

Periodically the area has been subject to wildfires that force thousands to evacuate. The most recent are the December 2017 Lilac Fire and the May 2014 San Diego County wildfires; before them was the Witch Creek Fire in 2007 and the Cedar Fire in 2003. California defines a fire season in which fires are most likely to occur, usually between late July and late October (which are the driest months of the area). Signs posted in numerous spots of the county provide information on the level of threats from fires based on weather conditions.

Regions 
Northern San Diego County is known as North County; the eastern suburbs are collectively known as East County; the rural areas located further east and extending to the Imperial County line are known as the Mountain Empire; and the southern suburbs, extending to the Mexican border, are collectively known as the South Bay or South County, including South San Diego, an exclave of the city of San Diego which has no land connection to the rest of the city.

Climate

Under the Köppen climate classification system, the urban and suburban San Diego area straddles areas of Mediterranean climate (CSa) to the north and semi-arid climate (BSh) to the south and east. As a result, it is often described as "arid Mediterranean" and "semi-arid steppe." Farther east, arid desert conditions prevail. Western San Diego's climate is characterized by warm, dry summers and mild winters with most of the annual precipitation falling between November and March. The city has mild, mostly dry weather, with an average of 201 days above  and low rainfall ( annually). Temperatures exceed  only four days a year. Most rainfall occurs from November to April.

The climate in the San Diego area, like much of California, often varies significantly over short geographical distances resulting in microclimates. In San Diego's case this is mainly due to the city's topography (the Bay, and the numerous hills, mountains, and canyons). This happens every year in May and June. Even in the absence of June gloom, inland areas tend to experience much more significant temperature variations than coastal areas, where the ocean serves as a moderating influence.

Though there are few wet days per month during the rainy period, rainfall can be heavy when it does occur. However, the rainfall is greater in the higher elevations of San Diego. Some of the higher areas of San Diego, such as Palomar Mountain and the Laguna Mountains, receive  of rain per year, supporting lush forests similar to the Sierra Nevada and California Coast Range. The Colorado Desert portion of the county lies to the east of the mountains, which receives the least amount of precipitation; Borrego Springs, the largest population center in the desert, averages only , with a high evaporation rate.

Adjacent counties and municipalities

National protected areas
 Cabrillo National Monument
 Cleveland National Forest (part)
 San Diego National Wildlife Refuge Complex, which includes
 San Diego National Wildlife Refuge
 San Diego Bay National Wildlife Refuge
 Tijuana Slough National Wildlife Refuge
 Seal Beach National Wildlife Refuge (located in Orange County)

There are seven official wilderness areas in San Diego County that are part of the National Wilderness Preservation System. Four of these are integral parts of Cleveland National Forest, whereas three are managed by the Bureau of Land Management. Some of these extend into neighboring counties (as indicated below):

 Otay Mountain Wilderness (BLM)
 Pine Creek Wilderness (Cleveland National Forest)
 Hauser Wilderness (Cleveland National Forest)
 Carrizo Gorge Wilderness (BLM)
 Sawtooth Mountains Wilderness (BLM)
 Agua Tibia Wilderness (Cleveland National Forest) partly in Riverside County
 San Mateo Canyon Wilderness (Cleveland National Forest) mostly in Riverside County

State parks and protected areas

 Anza-Borrego Desert State Park (part)
 Torrey Pines State Reserve
 Cuyamaca Rancho State Park
 Palomar Mountain State Park
 San Pasqual Battlefield State Historic Park
 Old Town San Diego State Historic Park
 Border Field State Park
 Tijuana River National Estuarine Research Reserve
 San Onofre State Beach
 Moonlight State Beach
 Carlsbad State Beach
 South Carlsbad State Beach
 Leucadia State Beach
 San Elijo State Beach
 Cardiff State Beach
 Torrey Pines State Beach
 Silver Strand State Beach

Mountains

 Cuyamaca Mountains
 In-Ko-Pah Mountains
 Jacumba Mountains
 Laguna Mountains
 Palomar Mountain
 Peninsular Ranges
 San Ysidro Mountains
 Santa Ana Mountains
 Volcan Mountains

There are 236 mountain summits and peaks in San Diego County including:

 Black Mountain
 Cuyamaca Peak (second highest point in San Diego County)
 Cowles Mountain (highest point in the city of San Diego)
 Mount Helix
 Hot Springs Mountain (highest point in San Diego County)
 Margarita Peak
 Mount Soledad
 Stonewall Mountain
 El Cajon Mountain

Bays and lagoons

 Buena Vista Lagoon
 Agua Hedionda Lagoon
 Batiquitos Lagoon
 San Elijo Lagoon
 Los Peñasquitos Lagoon
 Mission Bay
 San Diego Bay

Lakes

Lake Cuyamaca
Lake Hodges
Santee Lakes
Sweetwater Reservoir
Upper Otay Reservoir
Lower Otay Reservoir
Lake Wohlford
El Capitan Reservoir
Sutherland Reservoir
Lake Henshaw
Lake Murray
San Vicente Reservoir
Lake Jennings
Barrett Dam
Natural Rock Tanks
Little Laguna Lake
Big Laguna Lake
Big Lake
Twin Lakes
Jean Lake
Lost Lake
Swan Lake
Lake Miramar
Lake Poway
Dixon Lake

Lindo Lake

Rivers

San Diego River
San Luis Rey River
San Dieguito River
Sweetwater River
Otay River
Tijuana River
Tijuana River Mouth State Marine Conservation Area
Santa Margarita River

Environmental risks 

More than 1,700 tons of radioactive waste are stored at San Onofre Nuclear Generating Station, which sits in an area where there is a record of past tsunamis.

Demographics

Since at least 2014, San Diego County is the fifth most populous county in the United States. In 2000, only about 3% of San Diego County residents left the county for work while 40,000 people commuted into the metropolitan area.

2020 census

Note: the US Census treats Hispanic/Latino as an ethnic category. This table excludes Latinos from the racial categories and assigns them to a separate category. Hispanics/Latinos can be of any race.

Racial and Ethnic Composition since 1960

Race

The 2010 United States Census reported that San Diego County had a population of 3,095,313. The racial makeup of San Diego County was 1,981,442 (64.0%) White, 158,213 (5.1%) African American, 26,340 (0.9%) Native American, 336,091 (10.9%) Asian (4.7% Filipino, 1.6% Vietnamese, 1.4% Chinese, 3.2% Other Asian), 15,337 (0.5%) Pacific Islander, 419,465 (13.6%) from other races, and 158,425 (5.0%) from two or more races. Hispanic or Latino of any race were 991,348 people (32.0%). Including those of mixed race, the total number of residents with Asian ancestry was 407,984.

As of 2009, the racial makeup of the county was 79.4% White American, 5.6% Black or African American, 1% Native American, 10.4% Asian, 0.5% Pacific Islander, 10.3% from other races, and 3.6% from two or more races. 31.3% of the population were Hispanic or Latino of any race.

67.0% spoke only English at home; 21.9% spoke Spanish, 3.1% Tagalog and 1.2% Vietnamese.

Other demographics
As of 2018 Census Bureau estimates, there were 3,343,364 people, 1,067,846 households, and 663,449 families residing in the county.

In 2000 there were 994,677 households, out of which 33.9% had children under the age of 18 living with them, 50.7% were married couples living together, 11.6% had a female householder with no husband present, and 33.3% were non-families. 24.2% of all households were made up of individuals, and 7.9% had someone living alone who was 65 years of age or older. The average household size was 2.73 and the average family size was 3.29.

As of 2000, in the county the population was spread out, with 25.7% under the age of 18, 11.30% from 18 to 24, 32.0% from 25 to 44, 19.8% from 45 to 64, and 11.2% who were 65 years of age or older. The median age was 33 years. For every 100 females, there were 101.2 males. For every 100 females age 18 and over, there were 99.7 males.

In 2012, it was estimated that there were 198,000 unauthorized immigrants; the origin of the plurality of them is Mexico.

In 2018, the median household income was $70,824; most people spend more than 30% of their income on housing costs. In August of that year, the median home price was $583,000; this is lower than the median home price in Los Angeles, and Orange counties.

Income
According to the 2000 Census, the median income for a household in the county was $47,067, and the median income for a family was $53,438. Males had a median income of $36,952 versus $30,356 for females. The per capita income for the county was $22,926.  About 8.9% of families and 12.4% of the population were below the poverty line, including 16.5% of those under age 18 and 6.8% of those age 65 or over.

Much of the county's high-income residents are concentrated in the northern part of the city of San Diego. The San Diego metropolitan area has two places with both a population of over 50,000 and a per capita income of over $40,000: Carlsbad and Encinitas.

The county's largest continuous high-income urban area is a triangle from a first point on the northern edge of Carlsbad, a second point southeast of Escondido, and a third point on the southern edge of La Jolla. It contains all or most of the cities of Carlsbad, Encinitas, Solana Beach, Del Mar, and Poway in addition to a substantial portion of northern San Diego.

Homelessness
According to a Point-In-Time count taken for the San Diego Regional Task Force on the Homeless, there were 8,576 homeless individuals on January 6, 2018, a 6% decrease from 2017. 3,586 were sheltered, and 4,990 were not. 4,912 (75.3%) were in the city of San Diego. North County Inland had 1,153 (13.4%), North County Coastal with 822 homeless (9.6%), 602 (7%) were found in South County, and 1,087 (12.7%) in East County.

Religion
According to the Pew Research Center , 68% of adults in the county are Christian, of whom 32% are Catholic. 27% were unaffiliated, and 5% adhered to a Non-Christian faith. According to the University of Southern California, in 2010, the largest faith in the county was Catholicism, followed by Nondenominational Christians, and Mormons.

In 2014, the county had 978 religious organizations, the seventh most out of all US counties.

Immigration data
In 2014 according to Pew Research Center, there are about 170,000 illegal aliens living in the region. San Diego has been a destination for trafficked minors from Mexico and the Philippines. In 2018, the United States Border Patrol caught an average of over a hundred individuals crossing the border illegally each day.

Economy
San Diego County and Imperial County are part of the Southern Border Region, one of nine such regions. As a regional economy, the Southern Border Region is the smallest but most economically diverse region in the state. However, the two counties maintain weak relations and have little in common aside from their common border. The region has a high cost of living. This includes the highest cost of water in the United States. , San Diego County is within the top ten highest cost of rent in the United States; this has led to people moving out of the county.

Agriculture
San Diego County's agriculture industry was worth $1.85 billion in 2013, and is one of the top five egg producing counties in the United States. In 2013, San Diego County also had the most small farms of any county in the United States, and had the 19th largest agricultural economy of any county in the United States. According to the San Diego Farm Bureau, San Diego County is the United States' leading producer of avocados and nursery crops. Until the early 20th century, San Diego County had a thriving wine industry; however the 1916 Charles Hatfield flood was the beginning of the end of the industry which included the destruction of the Daneri winery in Otay Valley. , there are roughly one hundred vineyards and wineries in San Diego County.

By the 20192020 statistical survey, California Department of Food & Agriculture (cdfa) found that the nursery trade dominated the county's agriculture by dollar value. Second place went to avocado production.

Breweries

The county has been called "the Craft Beer Capital of America". Brewing has been one of the fastest-growing business sectors with local breweries ranking among the 50 largest craft brewers in the United States and breweries that are consistently rated among the top breweries in the world.

Cannabis

Commercial operations to grow, test, or sell cannabis are not allowed in the unincorporated areas of the county. Companies must be licensed by the local agency to operate and each city or county may authorize none or only some of these activities. Local governments may not prohibit adults, who are in compliance with state laws, from growing, using, or transporting marijuana for personal use.

Tourism

Tourism plays a large part in the economics of the San Diego metropolitan area. Tourists are drawn to the region for a well rounded experience, everything from shopping to surfing as well as its mild climate. Its numerous tourist destinations include Westfield UTC, Seaport Village, Westfield Mission Valley and Fashion Valley Mall for shopping. SeaWorld San Diego and Legoland California as amusement parks. Golf courses such as Torrey Pines Golf Course and Balboa Park Golf Course. Museums such as the San Diego Museum of Man, San Diego Museum of Art, Reuben H. Fleet Science Center, San Diego Natural History Museum, USS Midway Museum, and the San Diego Air and Space Museum. Historical places such as the Gaslamp Quarter, Balboa Park and Old Town San Diego State Historic Park. Wildlife refuges, zoos, and aquariums such as the Birch Aquarium at Scripps, San Diego Zoo's Safari Park, San Diego Zoo and San Diego-La Jolla Underwater Park. Outdoor destinations include the Peninsular Ranges for hiking, biking, mountainboarding and trail riding. Surfing locations include Swami's, Stone Steps Beach, Torrey Pines State Beach, Cardiff State Beach, San Onofre State Beach and the southern portion of Black's Beach.

The region is host to the second largest cruise ship industry in California which generates an estimated $2 million annually from purchases of food, fuel, supplies, and maintenance services. In 2008 the Port of San Diego hosted 252 ship calls and more than 800,000 passengers.

Culture

The culture of San Diego is influenced heavily by American and Mexican cultures due to its position as a border town, its large Hispanic population, and its history as part of Spanish America and Mexico. The area's longtime association with the U.S. military also contributes to its culture. Present-day culture includes many historical and tourist attractions, a thriving musical and theatrical scene, numerous notable special events, a varied cuisine, and a reputation as one of America's premier centers of craft brewing.

Sites of interest
Mount Laguna Observatory, owned and primarily operated by San Diego State University
Palomar Observatory, owned and primarily operated by the California Institute of Technology
Sea World of San Diego, on Mission Bay.
Mission Bay Recreation Area, including Fiesta Island, a sheltered bay popular for water sports, also known for the annual Over the line tournament.
Mission San Diego de Alcala, the first of California's 21 Spanish missions. It is an operating Roman Catholic parish and also is open for historical interest tours during the week. It is located near the interchange of Interstates 8 and 15.
Mission San Luis Rey, founded on June 13, 1798, by Padre Fermín Lasuén. It is the 18th of the Spanish missions established in California. It is an operating Roman Catholic parish and is open every day for historical interest tours. It is located near Route 76 in the Oceanside area.
Balboa Park, with numerous museums and other cultural locations, just north of Downtown San Diego.
San Diego Zoo, located in Balboa Park
Presidio Park, located on a bluff directly above Old Town, a city historic park on the site of the San Diego Presidio, the first European settlement in California.
San Diego Bay contains the aircraft carrier USS Midway now used as a memorial ship and as a floating museum, and the eight floating museum ships of the San Diego Maritime Museum. Harbor cruises, sailing, and sport fishing are also available
San Diego Botanic Garden, a 37-acre botanic oasis in the coastal community of Encinitas. Features 4 miles of meandering trails, 5,300+ plant species and 29 uniquely themed gardens, including the largest public bamboo collection in North America.
Legoland California, a Lego theme park in Carlsbad.
Alta Vista Gardens is a Botanical Garden in Vista dedicated to bringing together 'People, Nature & Art'.
Mount Ecclesia is a historic district noted for its singular architecture and the preservation of nature grounds and gardens, offering a unique meditative walking experience. It is located about a mile east of Interstate 5 in the Oceanside area.
San Dieguito County Park

Sports

The most popular sports team in the San Diego metropolitan area is Major League Baseball (MLB)'s San Diego Padres. The college sports teams of the San Diego State Aztecs are also locally popular.

Major professional team

Other highest-level professional teams 
{| class="wikitable sortable" style="text-align:center;"
|-
!Club
!Sport
!Since
!League
!Venue (capacity)
!Titles
|-
| style="text-align:left;"|San Diego Wave FC
|Soccer (women's)
|2022
|National Women's Soccer League (NWSL)
|Torero Stadium (6,000)
|
|-
| style="text-align:left;"|San Diego Seals
|Lacrosse
|2017
|National Lacrosse League (NLL)
|Pechanga Arena (12,920)
|
|-
| style="text-align:left;"|San Diego Legion
|Rugby union
|2018
|Major League Rugby (MLR)
|SDSU Sports Deck (3,000)
|
|-
| style="text-align:left;"|San Diego Sockers
|Indoor soccer
|1978
|Major Arena Soccer League (MASL)
|Pechanga Arena (12,000)
|15
|-
| style="text-align:left;"|San Diego Strike Force
|Indoor football
|2019
|Indoor Football League (IFL)
|Pechanga Arena (12,000)
|
|-
| style="text-align:left;"|San Diego Aviators
|Tennis
|2014
|World TeamTennis (WTT)
|Omni La Costa Court (2,100)
|1 (2016)
|-
| style="text-align:left;"|San Diego Growlers
|Ultimate
|2015
|American Ultimate Disc League (AUDL)
|varies
|
|-
| style="text-align:left;"|San Diego Lions
|Australian football
|1997
|United States Australian Football League (USAFL)
| varies
|2 (2001, 2006)
|-
| style="text-align:left;"|San Diego Yacht Club
|Sailing
|1886
|America's Cup
|varies
|3 (1987, 1988, 1992)
|-
| style="text-align:left;"|San Diego Swell
|Rugby league
|TBD{{efn|The Swell was announced in March 2021 as one of 14 league foundation teams, however its first season was postponed along with the rest of the entire announced Western Division}}
|North American Rugby League (NARL)
|TBD
|
|}

 Minor league professional teams 

 College teams 
The San Diego State Aztecs (MW), the San Diego Toreros (WCC), and the UC San Diego Tritons (BWC) are NCAA Division I teams. The Cal State San Marcos Cougars (CCAA) and Point Loma Nazarene Sea Lions (PacWest) are members of NCAA Division II, while the San Diego Christian Hawks (GSAC) and Saint Katherine Firebirds (CalPac) are a member of the NAIA. 

Government

The Government of San Diego County is defined and authorized under the California Constitution, California law, and the Charter of the County of San Diego. Much of the Government of California is in practice the responsibility of county governments such as the Government of San Diego County. The County government provides countywide services such as elections and voter registration, law enforcement, jails, vital records, property records, tax collection, public health, and social services. In addition the County serves as the local government for all unincorporated areas. Some chartered cities such as San Diego and Chula Vista provide municipal services such as police, public safety, libraries, parks and recreation, and zoning. Other cities such as Del Mar and Vista arrange to have the County provide some or all of these services on a contract basis.

The county government is composed of the elected five-member Board of Supervisors, several other elected offices and officers
 
and numerous county departments and entities under the supervision of the Chief Administrative Officer such as the Probation Department. In addition, several entities of the government of California have jurisdiction conterminous with San Diego County, such as the San Diego Superior Court.

Under its foundational Charter, the five-member elected San Diego County Board of Supervisors is the county legislature. The board operates in a legislative, executive, and quasi-judicial capacity. As a legislative authority, it can pass ordinances for the unincorporated areas (ordinances that affect the whole county, like posting of restaurant ratings, must be ratified by the individual city). As an executive body, it can tell the county departments what to do, and how to do it. As a quasi-judicial body, the Board is the final venue of appeal in the local planning process.

As of January 2021, the members of the San Diego County Board of Supervisors are:

For several decades, ending in 2013, all five supervisors were Republican, white, graduates of San Diego State University, and had been in office since 1995 or earlier. The Board was criticized for this homogeneity, which was made possible because supervisors draw their own district lines and are not subject to term limits. (In 2010 voters put term limits in place, but they only apply going forward, so that each incumbent supervisor can serve an additional two terms before being termed out.) That pattern was broken in 2013 when Slater-Price retired; she was replaced by Democrat Dave Roberts, who won election to the seat in November 2012 and was inaugurated in January 2013.

The San Diego County Code is the codified law of San Diego County in the form of ordinances passed by the Board of Supervisors. The Administrative Code establishes the powers and duties of all officers and the procedures and rules of operation of all departments.

The county motto is "The noblest motive is the public good." County government offices are housed in the historic County Administration Center Building, constructed in 1935–1938 with funding from the Works Progress Administration.

Politics

Voting
San Diego County had historically been a Republican stronghold. The Republican presidential nominee carried the county in every presidential election from 1948 through 2004, except in 1992 when Bill Clinton won a plurality. In 2008, Barack Obama became the first Democratic presidential candidate to win a majority of votes in San Diego County since World War II; he won a majority of county votes again in 2012. In 2020, the county voted in favor of the Democratic presidential nominee Joe Biden by 22.8%, the largest margin for a Democrat since 1936.

 

 

 

 

 

 

The city of San Diego itself is more Democratic than the county's average and has voted for Democrats in each presidential election since 1992. Various cities within the county are swing areas that have split their votes in elections since 2000.  Republican strength is concentrated in North County, East County and the eastern backlands. Coronado has also traditionally been a Republican stronghold.

One unique feature of the political scene is the use of Golden Hall, a convention facility next to San Diego's City Hall, as "Election Central."  The County Registrar of Voters rents the hall to distribute election results. Supporters and political observers gather to watch the results come in; supporters of the various candidates parade around the hall, carrying signs and chanting; candidates give their victory and concession speeches and host parties for campaign volunteers and donors at the site; and television stations broadcast live from the floor of the convention center. The atmosphere at Election Central on the evening of election day has been compared to the voting portion of a political party national convention.

On November 4, 2008, San Diego County voted 53.71% for Proposition 8 which amended the California Constitution to ban same-sex marriages, thus restoring Proposition 22 which was overturned by a ruling from the California Supreme Court.  However the city of San Diego, along with the North County coastal cities of Del Mar, Encinitas, and Solana Beach, voted against Proposition 8. La Mesa was a virtual tie for Prop 8 support, while Carlsbad supported the referendum by only a 2% margin.

Federal and state representation
In the U.S. House of Representatives, San Diego County is split between five congressional districts:
 
 
 
  and
 .

In the California State Assembly, San Diego County is split between seven legislative districts:
 ,
 ,
 ,
 ,
 ,
 , and
 .

In the California State Senate, San Diego County is split between four legislative districts:
 ,
 ,
 , and
 .

Crime
The following table includes the number of incidents reported and the rate per 1,000 persons for each type of offense.

 Cities by population and crime rates 

Education
San Diego County contains three public state universities: University of California, San Diego; San Diego State University; and California State University, San Marcos. Major private universities in the county include University of San Diego (USD), Point Loma Nazarene University (PLNU), Alliant International University (AIU), and National University. It also includes three law schools, USD School of Law, California Western School of Law, and Thomas Jefferson School of Law.

Within the county there are 24 public elementary school districts, 6 high school districts, and 12 unified school districts. There are also 5 community college districts.

There are two separate public library systems in San Diego County: the San Diego Public Library serving the city of San Diego, and the San Diego County Library serving all other areas of the county. In 2010 the county library had 33 branches and two bookmobiles; circulated over 10.7 million books, CDs, DVDs, and other material formats; recorded 5.7 million visits to library branches; and hosted 21,132 free programs and events. The San Diego County Library is one of the 25 busiest libraries in the nation as measured by materials circulated.San Diego County Library: Annual Report FY 2009–2010. Dbpcosdcsgt.co.san-diego.ca.us (2009-09-21). Retrieved on 2014-05-24.

Community College Districts
Grossmont-Cuyamaca Community College District
MiraCosta Community College District
Palomar Community College District
San Diego Community College District
Southwestern Community College District

K-12 schools
School districts

K-12 unified:

 Borrego Springs Unified School District
 Bonsall Unified School District
 Carlsbad Unified School District
 Coronado Unified School District
 Mountain Empire Unified School District
 Oceanside Unified School District
 Poway Unified School District
 Ramona City Unified School District
 San Diego City Unified School District
 San Marcos Unified School District
 Vista Unified School District
 Valley Center-Pauma Unified School District
 Warner Unified School District

Secondary:

 Escondido Union High School District
 Fallbrook Union High School District
 Grossmont Union High School District
 Julian Union High School District
 San Dieguito Union High School District
 Sweetwater Union High School District

Elementary:

 Alpine Union Elementary School District
 Cajon Valley Union Elementary School District
 Cardiff Elementary School District
 Chula Vista Elementary School District
 Dehesa Elementary School District
 Del Mar Union Elementary School District
 Encinitas Union Elementary School District
 Escondido Union Elementary School District
 Fallbrook Union Elementary School District
 Jamul-Dulzura Union Elementary School District
 Julian Union Elementary School District
 La Mesa-Spring Valley School District
 Lakeside Union Elementary School District
 Lemon Grove Elementary School District
 National Elementary School District
 Rancho Santa Fe Elementary School District
 San Pasqual Union Elementary School District
 San Ysidro Elementary School District
 Santee School District
 Solana Beach Elementary School District
 South Bay Union School District
 Spencer Valley Elementary School District
 Vallecitos Elementary School District

Military

San Diego is the headquarters of the U.S. Navy's Eleventh Naval District and is the Navy's principal location for West Coast and Pacific Ocean operations. Naval Base San Diego, California is principal home to the Pacific Fleet (although the headquarters is located in Pearl Harbor). NAS North Island is located on the north side of Coronado, and is home to Headquarters for Naval Air Forces and Naval Air Force Pacific, the bulk of the Pacific Fleet's helicopter squadrons, and part of the West Coast aircraft carrier fleet.

The Naval Special Warfare Center is the primary training center for SEALs, and is also located on Coronado. The area contains five major naval bases and the U.S. Marines base Camp Pendleton. Marine Corps Base Camp Pendleton is the major West Coast base of the United States Marine Corps and serves as its prime amphibious training base. It is located on the Southern California coast, bordered by Oceanside to the south, San Clemente to the north, and Fallbrook to the east.

U.S. Navy
Naval Base San Diego, also known as 32nd Street Naval Station
Naval Amphibious Base Coronado
Naval Air Station North Island
Naval Base Point Loma, which includes the Submarine Base and the Fleet Antisubmarine Warfare Training Center
Space and Naval Warfare Systems Command (SPAWAR)
Naval Medical Center San Diego, also known as Bob Wilson Naval Hospital and Balboa Naval Hospital

U.S. Marine Corps
Marine Corps Base Camp Pendleton
Marine Corps Air Station Miramar
Marine Corps Recruit Depot San Diego

U.S. Coast Guard
Coast Guard Air Station San Diego

U.S. Air Force
San Diego Air National Guard Station, which is home to the 147th Combat Communications Squadron.

Media
San Diego County is primarily served by media in San Diego, including TV and radio stations based in the city.

Newspapers
San Diego County is served by many newspapers. The major regional paper is The San Diego Union-Tribune, also known as U-T San Diego or just "The U-T" by locals, is ranked 23rd in the country (by daily circulation) as of March 2013. The Union-Tribune serves both San Diego County and neighboring Imperial County. The former North County Times, based in Escondido and serving portions of Riverside County and North County, was purchased by the Union-Tribune in 2012 and closed down. For about a year after absorbing the North County Times the Union-Tribune published a North County edition, but the regional edition was later abandoned. The Los Angeles Times is also delivered in portions of the county. Many of the area's cities, towns and neighborhoods have their own local newspapers; the Union Tribune bought eight local weeklies in 2013 and is continuing to publish them as independent local newspapers. The San Diego Daily Transcript reports business and legal news. Privately published papers like the Military Press Newspaper and the Navy Dispatch serve the military community both on and off base.

Other media
County Television Network is a public-access television cable channel, offering a "hometown blend of C-SPAN, the Lifetime, History, Travel, and Discovery channels" for the county, and funded by fees paid by cable companies.

Transportation

Major highways

 Interstate 5
 Interstate 8
 Interstate 15
 Interstate 805
 State Route 11
 State Route 15
 State Route 52
 State Route 54
 State Route 56
 State Route 67
 State Route 75
 State Route 76
 State Route 78
 State Route 79
 State Route 94
 State Route 125
 State Route 163
 State Route 188
 State Route 282
 State Route 905

Border crossings to Mexico
 San Ysidro Port of Entry
 Otay Mesa Port of Entry
Otay Mesa East Port of Entry (projected opening 2024)
 Tecate Port of Entry

Railroads

 Amtrak (Pacific Surfliner)
 Metrolink
 The Coaster
 San Diego and Arizona Eastern Railway
 San Diego and Imperial Valley Railroad

Light rail and local transit
 San Diego Trolley
 San Diego Metropolitan Transit System (SDMTS/MTS)
 Sprinter
 North County Transit District (NCTD)

The Port of San Diego
 Embarcadero (San Diego)

Airports

 City of San Diego 
 San Diego International Airport (SAN) a.k.a. Lindbergh Field
 Montgomery-Gibbs Executive Airport (MYF)
Brown Field Municipal Airport (SDM) (formerly East Field, NAAS Otay Mesa, and NAAS Brown Field)

 Carlsbad 
 McClellan-Palomar Airport (CRQ) a.k.a. Palomar Airport or Carlsbad Airport

 El Cajon 
 Gillespie Field (SEE)

 Oceanside 
 Oceanside Municipal Airport (K0KB)

 Unincorporated San Diego County 
 Agua Caliente Airport (L54)
 Borrego Valley Airport (L08)
 Fallbrook Community Airpark (L18)
Jacumba Airport (L78)
Ocotillo Airport (L90)
 Ramona Airport (RNM)

Communities

Cities

 Former city 

Census-designated places

 Alpine
 Bonita
 Bonsall
 Borrego Springs
 Bostonia
 Boulevard
 Campo
 Camp Pendleton Mainside
 Camp Pendleton South
 Casa de Oro-Mount Helix
 Crest
 Del Dios
 Descanso
 Elfin Forest
 Eucalyptus Hills
 Fairbanks Ranch
 Fallbrook
 Granite Hills
 Harbison Canyon
 Harmony Grove
 Hidden Meadows
 Jacumba Hot Springs
 Jamul
 Julian
 Lake San Marcos
 Lakeside
 La Presa
 Mount Laguna
 Oak Grove
 Pala
 Pine Valley
 Potrero
 Rainbow
 Ramona
 Rancho San Diego
 Rancho Santa Fe
 San Diego Country Estates
 Spring Valley
 Valley Center
 Winter Gardens

Unincorporated communities

 4S Ranch
 Agua Caliente
 Ballena
 Banner
 Casa de Oro
 Dehesa
 De Luz
 De Luz Heights
 Dulzura
 East Otay Mesa
 Flinn Springs
 Foster
 Guatay
 Jesmond Dene
 Jofegan
 Kentwood-In-The-Pines
 Lincoln Acres
 Manzanita
 Ocotillo Wells
 Pala Mesa
 Palomar Mountain
 Pauma Valley
 Pine Hills
 Ranchita
 Rincon
 Santa Ysabel
 Shelter Valley
 Tecate
 Warner Springs
 Wynola

 Potential future incorporations and past efforts 
Some CDP's and other unincorporated communities of San Diego County have explored incorporating as independent cities/towns in the past, some of which have seen efforts culminate in ballot initiatives. Alpine, Fallbrook, Lakeside, Ramona, Rancho Santa Fe and Spring Valley have been tied to various incorporation studies, organized efforts and discussions in the past. Voters in Fallbrook previously rejected incorporation in 1981 and 1987. Rancho Santa Fe residents also rejected incorporation in 1987. Among the existing cities of San Diego County, some had multiple failed incorporation efforts before ultimately succeeding in becoming a city. Lemon Grove, for example, saw incorporation measures fail in 1955, 1958 and 1964 before a successful incorporation vote in 1977. Other cities have seen incorporation success thanks to mergers of neighboring unincorporated communities. Encinitas, for example, became a city through a combined effort between the then-unincorporated communities of Cardiff-by-the-Sea, Leucadia, New Encinitas, Old Encinitas and Olivenhain in 1986. Encinitas and Solana Beach in 1986 remain the most recent examples of successful campaigns for cityhood within the County of San Diego.

Indian reservations
San Diego County has 18 federally recognized Indian reservations, more than any other county in the United States. Although they are typical in size to other Indian reservations in California (many of which are termed "Rancherías"), they are relatively tiny by national standards, and all together total  of area.

 Barona Indian Reservation
Campo Indian Reservation
Capitan Grande Reservation
Ewiiaapaayp Indian Reservation
 Inaja and Cosmit Indian Reservation
Jamul Indian Village
 La Jolla Indian Reservation
 La Posta Indian Reservation
Los Coyotes Indian Reservation
Manzanita Indian Reservation
 Mesa Grande Indian Reservation
 Pala Indian Reservation
 Pauma and Yuima Indian Reservation
Rincon Indian Reservation
San Pasqual Indian Reservation
Santa Ysabel Indian Reservation
Sycuan Indian Reservation
 Viejas Indian Reservation

 Population ranking 
The population ranking of the following table is based on the 2020 census of San Diego County.

† county seatSee also

List of breweries in San Diego County, California
List of high schools in San Diego County, California
List of media set in San Diego County, California
List of museums in San Diego County, California
List of school districts in San Diego County, California
List of United States counties and county-equivalents
National Register of Historic Places listings in San Diego County, California
San Diego Association of Governments (SANDAG)

Notes

References

Further reading
Pryde, Philip R. San Diego: An Introduction to the Region'' (4th ed. 2004), a historical geography

External links

 
 San Diego Association of Governments (SANDAG) official website
 San Diego Tourism Authority
 San Diego Geographic Information Source

 
1850 establishments in California
California counties
Counties in Southern California
Geography of San Diego County, California
Metropolitan areas of California
Populated places established in 1850
San Diego metropolitan area
Majority-minority counties in California